The Peugeot Type 125 was a midrange car from Peugeot produced in 1910. In less than a year of production, 150 units were built at their Audincourt factory.

References
Peugeot Car Models from 1910-1949
Histomobile page on Type 125

Type 125
Cars introduced in 1910